The organ concertos of Johann Sebastian Bach are solo works for organ, transcribed and reworked from instrumental concertos originally composed by Antonio Vivaldi and the musically talented Prince Johann Ernst of Saxe-Weimar. While there is no doubt about the authenticity of BWV 592–596, the sixth concerto BWV 597 is now probably considered to be spurious. Composed during Bach's second period at the court in Weimar (1708–1717), the concertos can be dated more precisely to 1713–1714.

Bach also made several transcriptions of Vivaldi's concertos for single, two and four harpsichords from exactly the same period in Weimar. The original concertos were picked from Vivaldi's Op.3, L'estro armonico, composed in 1711, a set of twelve concertos for one, two and four violins. The publication of these Bach transcriptions by C.F. Peters in the 1850s and Breitkopf & Härtel in the 1890s played a decisive role in the Vivaldi revival of the twentieth century.

Weimar concerto transcriptions

In his Weimar period Bach transcribed concertos by, among others, Antonio Vivaldi and Prince Johann Ernst of Saxe-Weimar for organ and for harpsichord. Most of the harpsichord transcriptions probably originated between July 1713 and July 1714. The organ concertos, BWV 592–596, are scored for two manual keyboards and pedal, and probably originated from 1714 to 1717.

Concerto in G major, BWV 592

This concerto is a transcription of Prince Johann Ernst of Saxe-Weimar's . Bach arranged the same concerto for harpsichord (BWV 592a).

Movements:
 [without tempo indication – "Allegro assai" in the original]
 Grave (E minor)
 [without tempo indication – "Presto e staccato" in the original, "Presto" in Bach's harpsichord version]

Concerto in A minor, BWV 593

Movements:
 [without tempo indication – "Allegro" in Vivaldi's original]
 Adagio (D minor; "Larghetto e spiritoso" in Vivaldi's original)
 Allegro (senza pedale a due claviere)

Concerto in C major, BWV 594

This concerto is a transcription of Antonio Vivaldi's Grosso mogul violin concerto in D major, RV 208, of which a variant, RV 208a, was published as Op. 7 No. 11.

Movements:
 [without tempo indication – "Allegro" in Vivaldi's original]
 Recitativ: Adagio (A minor; "Recitative: Grave" in Vivaldi's original)
 Allegro - Cadenza - Allegro

Concerto in C major, BWV 595

Only one movement, without tempo indication, but also indicated as Allegro.

Exists in a variant for harpsichord, BWV 984 (first movement).

Concerto in D minor, BWV 596

 [Allegro] 
 Pieno. Grave – Fuge
 Largo e spiccato
 [Allegro]

This transcription of Vivaldi's Concerto in D minor for two violins and obbligato violoncello, Op.3, No.11 (RV 565), had the heading on the autograph manuscript altered by Bach's son Wilhelm Friedemann Bach who added "di W. F. Bach manu mei Patris descript" sixty or more years later. The result was that up until 1911 the transcription was misattributed to Wilhelm Friedemann. Despite the fact that Carl Friedrich Zelter, director of the Sing-Akademie zu Berlin where many Bach manuscripts were held, had suggested Johann Sebastian as the author, the transcription was first published as a work by Wilhelm Friedemann in 1844 in the edition prepared for C.F. Peters by Friedrich Griepenkerl. The precise dating and true authorship was later established from the manuscript: the handwriting and the watermarks in the manuscript paper conform to cantatas known to have been composed by Bach in Weimar in 1714–1715.

The autograph manuscript is remarkable for its detailed specifications of organ registration and use of the two manuals. The markings are also significant for what they show about performance practise at that time: during the course of a single piece, hands could switch manuals and organ stops could be changed.

First movement. From the outset in the original piece, Vivaldi creates an unusual texture: the two violins play as a duet and then are answered by a similar duet for obbligato cello and continuo bass. On the organ Bach creates his own musical texture by exchanging the solo parts between hands and having the responding duet on a second manual. For , Bach's redistribution of the constantly repeated quavers in the original is "no substitute for the lost rhetoric of the strings."

Second movement. The dense chordal writing in the three introductory bars of the Grave is unusual and departs from Vivaldi's specification of "Adagio e spiccato". Bach adapted the fugue to the organ as follows: the pedal does not play the bass line of the original allegro but has an accompanying role, rather than being a separate voice in the fugue; the writing does not distinguish between soloists and ripieno; parts are frequently redistributed; and extra semiquaver figures are introduced, particularly over the prolonged pedal point concluding the piece. The resulting fugue is smoother than the original, which is distinguished by its clearly delineated sections.  remarks that the way Vivaldi inverts the fugue subject must have appealed to Bach.

Third movement. The scoring for organ in the ritornello and solo episodes of this movement—a form of Siciliano—is unusual in Bach's writing for organ. The widely spaced chords that accompany the solo melody in the original are replaced by simple chords in the left hand. For Griepenkerl, the sweetness of the melody reflected the tender personality of Wilhelm Friedemann.

Fourth movement. The last movement of Op.3, No.11 is composed in ritornello A–B–A form. In the opening bars the first and second violins play in tutti the opening theme with its repeated quavers and clashing dissonances. Bach used the same theme for the opening chorus of his cantata Ich hatte viel Bekümmernis, BWV 21, first performed on 17 June 1714, shortly before ill health forced Prince Johann Ernst to leave Weimar for treatment in Bad Schwalbach.

Although each return of the theme with its chromatic falling bass accompaniment is instantly recognizable, Bach's allotting of parts between the two manuals (Oberwerk and Rückpositiv) can occasionally obscure Vivaldi's sharp distinction between solo and ripieno players.  Various elements of Vivaldi's string writing, that would normally be outside Bach's musical vocabulary for organ compositions, are included directly or with slight adaptations in Bach's arrangement. As well as the dissonant suspensions in the opening quaver figures, these include quaver figures in parallel thirds, descending chromatic fourths, and rippling semidemiquavers and semiquavers in the left hand as an equivalent for the tremolo string accompaniment. Towards the end of the piece, Bach fills out the accompaniment in the final virtuosic semiquaver solo episode by adding imitative quaver figures in the lower parts.  compares the dramatic ending—with its chromatic fourths descending in the pedal part—to that of the keyboard Sinfonia in D minor, BWV 779.

Concerto in E-flat major, BWV 597
Probably neither composed nor transcribed by Bach, and rather a trio sonata, by a composer of a later generation, than a concerto.

Movements:
 [without tempo indication]
 Gigue

Table

Discography

BWV 592–597
 Hans Fagius (2000). Bach Edition, Boxes 6 (CDs 41 and 45) and 22 (CDs 151–153 and 155). Recorded 1985–1986 and 1988–1989. Brilliant Classics 99365/3, /7; 99381/4, /5, /6, /8.

 Karl Richter (1974). Die Orgelkonzerte, Archiv Production 431119-2 digitally remastered from Polydor International.

Orchestral organ concertos
 André Isoir and  conducted by Martin Gester (1993). L'œuvre pour orgue et orchestre. Includes BWV 29/1 and reconstructions BWV 1052a, 1053a and 1059a. Calliope CAL 9720.
 Bart Jacobs and Les Muffatti (2019). Concertos for Organ and Strings. Includes Concerto in D major after BWV 169 and BWV 49, Concerto in D minor after BWV 146, BDW 188 and BWV 1052, Sinfonia in G major after BWV 156, Sinfonia in F major after BWV 75, Sinfonia in D major after BWV 29 and BWV 120a, Concerto in D moner after BWV 35 and BWV 1055, Concerto in G minor after BWV 1041 and BWV 1058. Ramée (Outhere Music) RAM 1804.

References

Sources
 Introduction (in German and English) • Commentary (English translation—commentary in paperback original is in German)

External links
 At IMSLP website:
BWV 592 and BWV 592a: Violin Concerto in G major (Johann Ernst Prinz von Sachsen-Weimar)
Organ Concerto in A minor, BWV 593 (Bach, Johann Sebastian) and Concerto for 2 Violins in A minor, RV 522 (Vivaldi, Antonio)
Organ Concerto in C major, BWV 594 (Bach, Johann Sebastian)
Organ Concerto in C major, BWV 595 (Bach, Johann Sebastian) and Violin Concerto in C major (Johann Ernst Prinz von Sachsen-Weimar)
Organ Concerto in D minor, BWV 596 (Bach, Johann Sebastian) and Concerto in D minor, RV 565 (Vivaldi, Antonio)
Organ Concerto in E-flat major, BWV 597 (Bach, Johann Sebastian)
 Pages at James Kibbie's Bach Organ Works website containing free downloads of recordings on various 18th-century organs in AAC and MP3 format: BWV 592 • BWV 593 • BWV 594 • BWV 595 • BWV 596

Concertos by Johann Sebastian Bach